The South Sydney Rabbitohs are a professional Australian rugby league club based in Redfern, a suburb of inner-southern Sydney, New South Wales. They participate in the National Rugby League (NRL) premiership and are one of nine existing teams from the state capital, Sydney. They are often called Souths or The Bunnies.

The club was formed in 1908, as one of the founding members of the New South Wales Rugby Football League, making them one of Australia's oldest rugby league teams. The Rabbitohs were formed, under their original 1908 articles of association, with the NSWRL competition, to represent the Sydney municipalities of Redfern, Alexandria, Zetland, Waterloo, Mascot and Botany. They are one of only two NSW foundation clubs still present in the NRL, the other being the Sydney Roosters.

The Rabbitohs' traditional heartland covers the once typically working-class suburbs of inner-south Sydney. The club is based in Redfern, where the club's administration and training facilities are located, however they have long held a wide supporter base spread all over New South Wales. The team's home ground is currently Stadium Australia in Sydney Olympic Park. South Sydney are the most successful professional team in the history of Australian rugby league with 21 first grade premierships.

History

Origins (1908–1950) 
The South Sydney District Rugby League Football Club was formed at a meeting on 17 January 1908 at Redfern Town Hall when administrator J. J. Giltinan, cricketer Victor Trumper and politician Henry Hoyle gathered together in front of a large crowd of supporters. The club played in the first round of the newly formed New South Wales Rugby League, defeating North Sydney 11–7 at Birchgrove Oval on 20 April 1908. The team went on to win the inaugural premiership then successfully defended their title in the 1909 season, winning the Grand Final by default. During these early years Arthur Hennessy was considered the "founding father" of the South Sydney rugby league club. A hooker and prop forward, Hennessy was Souths' first captain and coach. He was also New South Wales' first captain and Australia's first test captain in 1908. S. G. "George" Ball became Club Secretary in 1911 after Arthur Hennessy stood down from the position, and he remained in that capacity for over fifty years, only retiring a few years before his death in 1969.

After further premiership success in 1914 and 1918, South Sydney won seven of the eight premierships from 1925 to 1932, missing out only in 1930. The 1925 side went through the season undefeated and is only one of six Australian premiership sides in history to have achieved this feat. Such was Souths' dominance in the early years of the rugby league competition that the Rabbitohs were labelled "The Pride of the League".

South Sydney struggled through most of the 1940s, only making the semifinals on two occasions (1944 and 1949). South Sydney's longest losing streak of 22 games was during the period 1945–1947. In the 1945 season they only managed to win one game while in 1946 they were unable to win a single game.

Golden era (1950–1955) 
In the 1950s South Sydney again had great success, winning five of the six premierships from 1950 to 1955, and losing the 1952 Grand Final against Western Suburbs in controversial circumstances. The 1951 side's point scoring feat in their 42–14 victory over Manly-Warringah remains the highest score by a team in a Grand Final and "the miracle of '55" involved South Sydney winning 11 straight sudden death matches to win the premiership. Players that were involved in these years included Denis Donoghue, Jack Rayner, Les "Chicka" Cowie, Johnny Graves, Ian Moir, Greg Hawick, Ernie Hammerton, Bernie Purcell and Clive Churchill. Churchill, nicknamed "the Little Master" for his brilliant attacking fullback play, is universally regarded as one of the greatest ever Australian rugby league players.

Inbetween years (1956–1964) 
In the late 1950s Souths began a poor run of form failing to make the finals from 1958 to 1964.

"Glory years" (1965–1971) 
In 1965 a talented young side made the Grand Final against St. George who were aiming to secure their tenth straight premiership. The young Rabbitohs were not overawed by the Dragons' formidable experience and in front of a record crowd of 78,056 at the Sydney Cricket Ground, they went down narrowly 12–8. The nucleus of this side went on to feature in Australian representative teams for the next six years and ensured another golden period for South Sydney making five successive grand finals from 1967 to 1971, winning four. Bob McCarthy, John O'Neill, Eric Simms, Ron Coote, Mike Cleary and John Sattler from 1965 were later joined by Elwyn Walters, Ray Branighan, Paul Sait, Gary Stevens and coach Clive Churchill to form a fearsome combination before internal strife and poaching by other clubs from 1972 onwards unravelled the star studded pack. From this period comes part of South's and Australian Rugby League folklore when in the 1970 premiership decider against Manly, captain John Sattler inspired the side to victory playing out 70 minutes of the match with his jaw broken in three places after being king hit by Manly prop John Bucknall.

Hard times and revival (1972–1989) 
Financial problems started to hit Souths in the early 1970s, forcing some players to go to other clubs. The licensed Leagues Club, traditionally such an important revenue provider to all first grade league sides, was closed in 1973 but a "Save Our Souths" campaign ensured the club survived. "Super Coach" Jack Gibson's arrival turned the club's form, winning the pre-season competition in 1978. The club captured victories in the mid-week Tooth Cup competition in 1981 and in the pre-season "Sevens" competition in 1988. The Rabbitohs made the finals on five occasions in the 1980s, including a dominant season to finish as minor premiers in 1989. The 1989 season proved to be the club's most successful in years, but was also the last time the club reached the finals until 2007. The following season the Rabbitohs finished as wooden spooners.

Financial trouble, exclusion and readmission (1990–2002) 
The club stayed afloat in the 1990s despite major financial problems. Souths' only success came in 1994 when they won the pre-season competition, defeating the Brisbane Broncos 27–26 in the final. The Super League War and the eventual formation of the National Rugby League affected the club greatly when it was determined in 1998 that the newly formed competition would be contracted to 14 teams for the 2000 season. Following a series of mergers by other teams, South Sydney failed to meet the National Rugby League's selection criteria to compete in the competition and were subsequently excluded from the premiership at the end of the 1999 season.

In 2000 and 2001, South Sydney fought their way back into the competition following a string of high-profile legal battles against the National Rugby League and News Limited. A number of well attended public rallies took place during this time, as supporters from many different clubs got behind South Sydney's case. Upon appeal to the Federal Court in 2001, South Sydney won readmission into the premiership for the 2002 season.

NRL era (2002–present)

Early struggles (2002–06) 
After being readmitted, the Rabbitohs were initially unsuccessful in the premiership, finishing amongst the bottom three teams for five seasons straight including three wooden spoons. However, following the club's takeover by actor Russell Crowe and businessman Peter Holmes à Court in 2006, the club has had great success in securing a number of major national and international player signings such as the four Burgess Brothers and Greg Inglis. The club was also successful in recruiting several key managerial positions including Jason Taylor as head coach in 2007 and more recently Michael Maguire in 2012.

South Sydney was a party to one of the sponsorship deals promoted by the fraudulent company Firepower International.

Building years (2007–11) 
South Sydney won their first three games of the 2007 season (marking their best start to a season since 1972) and being competitive in every game. On the back of one of the best defences in the competition, the Rabbitohs finished strongly making the semi-finals for the first time since 1989. They finished the season in seventh position, going down to Manly in the playoffs.

On 26 January 2008, the Rabbitohs lost 24–26 to the Leeds Rhinos in front of 12,000 fans at the University of North Florida in Jacksonville, Florida, the first time first-grade professional rugby league teams from Australia and England have played each other in the United States.

May 2008 saw the sudden resignation of the then current Executive chairman and CEO, Peter Holmes à Court. He had been appointed to the role of CEO at the start of 2008. Reports suggested that Holmes à Court had been forced to stand down after his relationship with Russell Crowe had deteriorated beyond repair.

The South Sydney Rabbitohs celebrated their centenary year during the 2008 National Rugby League season. That year they were named the National Trust's inaugural 'Community Icon', in recognition of the club's significant longstanding contribution to sport and sporting culture at both state and national levels.

On 11 November 2010, South Sydney signed Melbourne back Greg Inglis on a three-year deal starting in the 2011 season.

In April 2011, Souths announced Michael Maguire would replace retiring coach John Lang for the 2012 season, signing as head coach on a three-year deal.

Michael Maguire (2012–17) 
In Maguire's first year as coach, South Sydney finished third at the end of the regular season, qualifying for the finals for the first time since 2007 and just the second time since 1989, recording their 1000th First Grade win in the process. Souths were eventually eliminated in the preliminary final, losing 32–8 to the Bulldogs.

In 2013 Souths finished second on the table, again reaching the preliminary finals before being knocked out by Manly in a 30–20 loss.

South Sydney finished third at the end of the regular season in 2014. In week 1 of the finals series they defeated Manly 40–24 and backing up in week 3 to beat the Roosters 32–22 in the preliminary final, qualifying for their first grand final since 1971, playing the Canterbury-Bankstown Bulldogs.

After a slim lead of 6–0 early in the first half of the decider, Souths went on to score 4 unanswered tries in the second to defeat Canterbury-Bankstown 30–6, breaking a 43-year drought to claim the premiership. Lock forward Sam Burgess received the Clive Churchill Medal despite playing Hath entirety of the match with a fractured cheekbone suffered Entirely due to A head clash during the first Tackle of the game. ThiS was the last match Burgess played before his departure to rugby union.

On Thursday 9 October 2014, the South Sydney club were presented with the Keys to the City of Randwick by Mayor Ted Seng at a presentation ceremony at Souths Juniors in Kingsford and later the same day awarded the Keys to the City of Sydney by Lord Mayor Clover Moore at a reception at Sydney Town Hall.

On 23 October 2014, Holmes à Court sold his 50% share of Blackcourt League Investments Pty Limited, and consequently his 37.5% stake in South Sydney, to James Packer's ScrumPac Pty Ltd, a subsidiary of Packer's Consolidated Press Holdings.

South Sydney started the 2015 season in promising fashion before injuries to key players set in with the club finishing seventh on the table and qualifying for the finals.  In week one of the finals they played against Cronulla in the elimination match and lost 28–12, ending their season.

The 2016 NRL season proved to be a disappointing one for Souths as they finished 12th on the table, with only 9 wins for the entire season.

The 2017 NRL season seemed to mirror the previous year with the club again finishing 12th on the table and captain Greg Inglis missing the entire season through injury after an anterior cruciate ligament injury acquired in the first game of the year. At seasons end, coach Michael Maguire was terminated and assistant coach Anthony Seibold was appointed head coach.

Anthony Seibold (2018) 
For the 2018 NRL season, many experts predicted Souths to finish outside the top 8 but the club performed strongly throughout the year finishing third on the table at the end of the regular season. In week one of the finals, South Sydney played against Melbourne and looked to have secured the victory until a late try and a field goal gave Melbourne the win 29–28. In week two, South Sydney played against St George for the first time in the finals series since 1984.  Souths won the match 13–12 thanks to three field goals from Adam Reynolds including one in the final minute of the match. In the preliminary final, Souths faced off against arch rivals Eastern Suburbs in what would also be the last match played at the Sydney Football Stadium. In front of a ground record crowd of 44,380, Souths were defeated 12–4.

Wayne Bennett (2019–21) 
South Sydney started the 2019 NRL season strongly with the club winning 10 of their first 11 matches.  Following the 2019 State of Origin series, Souths suffered a slump in form losing four games in a row. The club then recovered towards the end of the regular season winning 3 games in a row to finish in third place on the table and qualified for the finals series.

South Sydney would go on to lose their qualifying final against their arch rivals the Sydney Roosters 30–6 in week one of the 2019 finals series at the Sydney Cricket Ground. In the elimination final against Manly-Warringah, Souths won a hard-fought match 34–26 at ANZ Stadium to reach their second consecutive preliminary final. In the preliminary final against Canberra, Souths would go on to fall short of a grand final appearance losing the match 16–10 at a sold out Canberra Stadium.

South Sydney finished the 2020 NRL season in sixth place and qualified for the finals. Along the way, the club recorded big victories over Parramatta winning 38–0 and defeating arch-rivals the Sydney Roosters 60–8 which was Souths' biggest ever win over the club.  Souths would then defeat Newcastle and Parramatta to reach the preliminary final against Penrith. In the preliminary final, Souths lost a close encounter 20–16 which ended their season. The result also meant it was the club's third straight preliminary final loss.

South Sydney began the 2021 NRL season as one of the favourites to win the premiership. After losing to Melbourne in the opening round of the year, Souths went on to win the next seven games in a row. In the next three games however, the club suffered a 50–0 loss against Melbourne and a 56–12 loss against Penrith. In round 22, they set a new record in the competitions 113-year history being the first club to score 30 points or more in eight consecutive matches. Souths would go on to finish the regular season in third place after winning 13 of their last 14 matches. In week one of the finals series, South Sydney defeated Penrith 16–10 to book a place in the preliminary final for the fourth season in a row. In the preliminary final, the club defeated Manly 36–16 to reach the Grand Final for the first time since 2014 and only the second time since 1971. In the 2021 NRL Grand Final, South Sydney trailed Penrith 8–6 at the half-time break. In the second half, Souths player Cody Walker threw a long pass which was intercepted by Penrith's Stephen Crichton which saw the player score untouched under the posts. With five minutes remaining, South Sydney scored in the corner through Alex Johnston. South Sydney captain Adam Reynolds then had a conversion attempt from the sideline to make the game 14–14. Reynolds narrowly missed his attempt which went just wide of the post. In the final minute, Reynolds attempted a two-point field goal which fell short of the crossbar. Penrith would go on to win the match 14–12.

Jason Demetriou (2022–present) 
Following the departure of coach Wayne Bennett and captain Adam Reynolds, Rabbitohs assistant coach Jason Demetriou and lock Cameron Murray were appointed as head coach and captain respectively. The 2022 NRL season got off to a rough start for Souths, losing three of their first four games, including an upset loss to the Brisbane Broncos, and a golden point loss to the Melbourne Storm. However, Souths would finish the regular season strongly, winning seven of their last ten games, including a four game winning streak between rounds 16 and 19, and narrow losses to Cronulla-Sutherland and Panthers. The South Sydney club finished seventh with a win-loss record of 14-10.

In week one of the finals, Souths beat arch-rivals the Sydney Roosters 30-14 after losing to them the week prior. The game was notable for having seven sin bins (four of which were Souths players), setting a new record for the most sin bins in a single game. The following week, Souths beat the Cronulla-Sutherland Sharks in a one-sided match, winning 38-12, and advancing to a fifth consecutive preliminary final, where they would face the Penrith Panthers. After leading 12-0, Penrith scored five unanswered tries to win the game 32-12, ending South Sydney’s season.

Emblem

The club mascot is the rabbitoh, a now-disused term that was commonly used in the early 20th century to describe hawkers who captured and skinned rabbits and then sold the meat at markets, so named because they would shout "rabbit-oh!" around the markets to attract buyers. The club is also informally referred to as the Rabbits, Bunnies or Souths.

Exactly how South Sydney came to be known as the Rabbitohs is unknown. According to one version of events, dating from pre-schism days at the turn of the 20th century, some of the club's players earned some extra money on Saturday mornings as rabbit-oh men, staining their jerseys with rabbit blood in the process; when they played in those blood stained jumpers that afternoon, opponents from wealthier rugby clubs did not always appreciate the aroma and would mockingly repeat the "Rabbitoh!" cry. Another version was that the term was a disparaging reference by opposing teams to South's home ground being plagued with "rabbit 'oles"; in those early days Redfern Oval was then known as Nathan's Cow Paddock. A third version claims the Rabbitoh name was adopted from that of the touring Australian rugby union teams of the early 1900s who were nicknamed "Rabbits" prior to discarding the name in 1908 in favour of the moniker "Wallabies".

The "Rabbitoh" emblem, a running white rabbit, first appeared on the team's jersey in 1959. The Rabbitoh emblem has in various forms been carried as the club's crest on every player's jersey ever since. The original "Rabbitoh" emblem design that appeared on the team's jerseys throughout the 1960s and 1970s has now been incorporated on the current jersey.

The South Sydney Rabbitohs celebrated their centenary year during 2008. The club released a centenary emblem to commemorate the occasion. To also coincide with the centenary year, Souths opted to alter their logo by removing the red and green oval from their emblem for a solid white rabbit with the words South Sydney Rabbitohs set in uppercase type.

Colours
South Sydney has used cardinal red and myrtle green colours on its playing jerseys for the vast majority of the club's history. Prior to the establishment of the rugby league club in 1908, the South Sydney rugby union team originally wore a red and green hooped jersey. Some sources have suggested that this combination of colours was due to the local rugby union club being nicknamed the "Redfern Waratahs". The first British inhabitants had often called the waratah a "red fern" instead, hence giving the suburb its name, and ultimately the local rugby club its emblem. Red and green dominate the colours of the waratah and hence, possibly, the South Sydney Rugby League Football Club adopted these colours for their jerseys. However, the suburb of Redfern was named in honour of William Redfern, one of the first doctors of the colony, who treated convicts and poor settlers as well as the wealthy.

The club's jersey has been a hooped-styled one comprising alternating red and green, and has been used for the vast majority of the club's history. In 1945 and 1946 the club broke with this tradition and used a green design with a red "V" around the collar, before reverting to the original hoop style. From 1980 to 1984 the team played in a strip which saw the inclusion of white hoops within a predominately green design with a central red stripe and was affectionately known as the "Minties" jersey (so-called due to its apparent similarity to the wrapper design of the popular sweet). With the introduction of "away" jerseys towards the end of the 20th century, the club initially introduced a predominantly white jersey for away matches which was changed to a predominantly black one for the 2006 season.

Before the start of the 2007 season, the club announced that the away jersey would be styled identically to the traditional home jersey, with the exception of sponsorship and the rabbit emblem, which has been styled similarly to the one that initially featured on jerseys in the 1960s. For season 2009, the rabbit emblem is black for home matches whilst the emblem is the original white for away matches.

The playing shorts worn were historically black, though in the late 1970s the club adopted green shorts with a red vertical stripe. This was then superseded by the white shorts of the "Minties" outfit. When the club subsequently reverted to their traditional playing strip, the decision was made to wear black shorts once more. In 2008 the Rabbitohs wore white shorts to match the white stripe running down the side of their jersey.

Geographic area
The South Sydney District Rugby League Football Club (precursor to the current corporate entity) was formed, under the original 1908 articles of association with the NSWRL competition, to represent the Sydney municipalities of  Alexandria, Botany, Mascot, Waterloo, Maroubra and Zetland.

Souths have a proud history of Indigenous players from the local district clubs including La Perouse United, Redfern All Blacks and Indigenous recruits from Country NSW.

Stadium
During the early years of the New South Wales Rugby League premiership, "home games" were not assigned very often. However, South Sydney played most of their games at the Royal Agricultural Society Ground (Sydney Showground) from 1908 until the club's departure in 1920. From 1911 onwards, the Sydney Sports Ground was also used interchangeably with the Agricultural Ground over a decade for hosting matches. In 1947 the club played its final season at the Sports Ground, before relocating to Redfern Oval in 1948. It was here that team played in the heart of the club's territory and played the vast majority of its allocated home matches.

In 1988, the club began to play in the Sydney Football Stadium, just built upon the former Sydney Sports Ground and Sydney Cricket Ground No. 2 Oval. The side continued to play here up until 2005, with the exception of 2000 and 2001 when South Sydney was absent from the premiership. During 2004–2005, when the Rabbitoh's contract with Sydney Football Stadium was about to expire, new home grounds were investigated at Gosford, North Sydney Oval and Telstra Stadium. Eventually the decision was made to relocate to Telstra Stadium at Sydney Olympic Park. The move was generally not well received by the fans, but provided considerably more income for the club, which was several million dollars in the red at the end of 2005.

In 2006 the club relocated home games to Stadium Australia in Sydney's west (known as Telstra Stadium until the conclusion of 2007). In February 2008, the Rabbitohs renewed their partnership with ANZ Stadium to play NRL home games and home finals at the venue for the next 10 years, commencing season 2008. The agreement runs until the end of 2017, superseding the inaugural three-year home ground arrangement at ANZ Stadium that started in 2006. During 2008 the City of Sydney Council completed a $19.5 million upgrade and renovation of Redfern Oval. From season 2009, the upgraded Redfern Oval will provide the Rabbitohs with training facilities and a venue for hosting pre-season and exhibition matches.

As well as their main home ground, South Sydney also play home games at the Sunshine Coast Stadium and at the Central Coast Stadium during the year.

As well as hosting Rabbitohs games, the stadium is also home to SEDA College NSW who host their rugby based curriculum at the venue.

Supporters
The South Sydney Rabbitohs continue to have a large supporter base in their traditional areas of South-eastern Sydney, despite having moved from Redfern Oval two decades ago, while also enjoying wide support throughout other rugby league playing centres around the country. The official South Sydney supporter group is known as "The Burrow".

South Sydney at one stage had the highest football club membership in the National Rugby League, with membership exceeding 35,000 as of June 23, 2015. That member number also included more than 11,000 ticketed members, the highest of the Sydney-based NRL clubs. Following the conclusion of the 2021 NRL season, new figures showed South Sydney to have the second highest membership of Sydney NRL clubs behind Parramatta.

It was announced during the 2010 Charity Shield game that both St. George Illawarra and Souths had exceeded the 10,000 milestone, making the 2010 season the first time two Sydney clubs had entered the season with 10,000 ticketed members each. The club had members from every state in Australia and international members in 22 countries. Football club membership peaked at some 22,000 when the club was re-admitted to the National Rugby League for season 2002.

"Group 14", a collection of club backers including businessmen, politicians, musicians and media personalities, was formed before the Rabbitohs' exclusion from the NRL in 1999. Members include Anthony Albanese, Laurie Brereton, Michael Cheika, Rodger Corser, Michael Daley, Andrew Denton, Cathy Freeman, Nick Greiner, Deirdre Grusovin, Ron Hoenig, Ray Martin, Mikey Robins, and Mike Whitney. They contributed to South Sydney's bid for reinstatement, following the club's exclusion from the competition at the end of the 1999 season. A sustained campaign of public support that year, unprecedented in Australian sporting history, saw 40,000 people attended a rally in the Sydney CBD in support of South Sydney's cause. In 2000 and 2001, public street marches took place in Sydney with in excess of 80,000 people rallying behind the Rabbitohs. The club also has a number of high-profile supporters as well, many of whom were dominant figures in their battle to be readmitted into the premiership in 2000 and 2001. In 2007, supporters set a new club record for attendance with an average home crowd figure of 15,702 being the highest ever since the introduction of the home and away system in 1974.

Notable supporters
Ben Affleck, American actor 
Anthony Albanese, 31st Prime Minister of Australia
Pamela Anderson, Canadian actress
Christian Bale, British actor famous for playing Batman
Boris Becker, former German tennis champion
Cameron Norrie, British tennis player
Richard Branson, British entrepreneur
Laurie Brereton, Australian politician
Michael Cheika, former Wallabies coach
Rodger Corser, Australian actor 
Russell Crowe, Australian actor and part owner of the Rabbitohs
Tom Cruise, American actor 
The 14th Dalai Lama
Michael Daley, Australian politician, former NSW opposition leader
Andrew Denton, Australian television presenter 
Snoop Dogg, American rapper
Jimmy Fallon, American television presenter 
Cathy Freeman, Olympian most famous for 400m win at Sydney 2000
Stephen Fry, British actor 
Chris Green, South African-Australian cricketer
Nick Greiner, former Premier of New South Wales
Deirdre Grusovin, Australian politician
Adam Hills, Australian television presenter
Lleyton Hewitt, Australian Grand Slam tennis champion 
Ron Hoenig, Australian politician
Eddie Jones, former Wallabies coach and current England coach.
Kristina Keneally, 42nd Premier of New South Wales
Jay Leno, American television presenter 
Ray Martin, Australian television presenter 
Eva Mendes, American actress
Martina Navratilova, American tennis player
Graham Norton, British television presenter 
Jamie Oliver, British celebrity chef
Ricky Ponting, former Australian cricket team captain
Pat Power, former Auxiliary Bishop of the Roman Catholic Archdiocese of Canberra and Goulburn
Kagiso Rabada, South African cricketer 
Burt Reynolds, American actor
Mikey Robins, Australian TV presenter
Cristiano Ronaldo, Portuguese soccer player and multiple Ballon d'Or winner
Tanveer Sangha, Australian cricketer
Mike Whitney, former Australian cricketer and television host 
Oprah Winfrey, American talk show host

Source:

Reggie the Rabbit
Reggie the Rabbit is the Rabbitohs' mascot. The mascot first appeared in lifesize form in 1968 after celebrity fan Don Lane brought back a suit from the US in time for the 1968 grand final against Manly Warringah Sea Eagles, won by the Rabbitohs 13–9. Perhaps the most notable of the early Reggies was the club's groundsman Reg Fridd. Standing just over four feet tall, the Rabbitohs lured the diminutive New Zealander from a touring production of Snow White and the Seven Dwarves, the same troupe that had yielded the second Reggie, Roscoe Bova, killed in a car accident in the early 1970s. Most teams in the National Rugby League maintain mascots. During 2000 and 2001, when Souths was excluded from the NRL, Anth Courtney was Reggie Rabbit appearing at the second Town Hall rally and at games at Redfern Oval as well as being active in travelling extensively around the state to attend fundraisers as Reggie Rabbit.

South Sydney Leagues Club

The Juniors
The Juniors aka Souths Juniors on Anzac Parade in Kingsford, New South Wales has been the club's leagues club since the old Souths Leagues closed in 2013.  The club is owned by the South Sydney District Junior Rugby Football League.

Juniors at the Junction
Juniors @ The Junction (Since 2009) – The result of a merger with South Sydney Junior Rugby League Club (Kingsford) and the struggling Maroubra Returned and Services League (RSL) Club. The club is on the site of the former Maroubra RSL club on Anzac Parade and Haig Street.

The Juniors on Hawkesbury
The Juniors on Hawkesbury (Since 2008) – in the Hawkesbury River

South Sydney Leagues Club
The South Sydney Leagues Club, colloquially known as Souths Leagues, was the club's official leagues club. The club closed in 2013 after being placed into administration with large debts.

Culture and tradition
In 1999 Russell Crowe bought the foundation bell at the Red and Green Ball for the club.

Kit sponsors and manufacturers

Rivalries
A book, The Book of Feuds, chronicling the rivalries of the Rabbitohs with their NRL competitors was written by Mark Courtney at the instigation of Russell Crowe. It has been used as a motivational tool before Souths matches and was later released on sale to the public.

Major 
 Sydney Roosters  – South Sydney and their fans have built up rivalries with other clubs, particularly the Sydney Roosters (Eastern Suburbs), the only other remaining foundation club.

South Sydney and the Roosters share inner-Sydney territory, resulting in a strong rivalry since 1908 when Souths beat Eastern Suburbs in the first grand final 14–12. Games between the neighbouring foundation clubs have since formed part of the oldest "local derby" in the competition. The rivalry increased after 1950 due to conflict between junior territories and since the 1970s escalated once more as both clubs drew key players away from each other (Souths lost internationals Ron Coote, Elwyn Walters and Jim Morgan to the Roosters from their last era of premiership winning teams, whilst more recently Souths lured key forwards Bryan Fletcher, Peter Cusack and centre Shannon Hegarty away from the Roosters 2002 premiership winning side) and later Michael Crocker. In Round 1, 2010, South Sydney and Roosters became the first clubs to play 200 matches against each other. The Sydney Roosters 36–10 victory put the ledger at 105 games won by South Sydney, 90 by the Roosters (Eastern Suburbs) and 5 drawn. To celebrate their rivalry, South Sydney and the Sydney Roosters play for the Ron Coote Cup annually.

 St George Dragons and St George Illawarra Dragons – The long-standing rivalry against St. George results in the annual Charity Shield match, originally played against the original St. George Dragons and now (since the joint venture formed with Illawarra Steelers) played against the current team, St. George Illawarra.

South Sydney and St. George have met several times in grand finals prior to the joint-venture and being the north-eastern neighbours of St. George, had many fierce encounters. In 2001, South Sydney chairman and club legend George Piggins said there would be no chance of the Charity Shield being revived if Souths were to be included back into the NRL saying "The Dragons: They sold us out". This was in reference to St. George signing an affidavit at the time which included that it would be detrimental if Souths were returned to the competition.

In 2018, both sides met for the first time in a finals match since 1984. Souths won a close semi-final 13–12.

Minor 
 Manly-Warringah Sea Eagles – 
South Sydney first met Manly-Warringah in the 1951 NSWRFL season's Grand Final.  South Sydney would win the match 42-14 which as of 2022 is the highest scoring grand final in NSWRL/NRL history.  Souths would then meet in the 1968 and 1970 grand finals which South Sydney both won.  In the 2013 preliminary final, Souths were looking to reach their first grand final since 1971 when they faced off against Manly.  Souths lead the match 14-0 early on but were eventually defeated by Manly 30–20.  In the 2021 NRL season, South Sydney and Manly once again met in the preliminary final but on this occasion South Sydney ran out comfortable winners to reach the 2021 NRL Grand Final.

Manly have, since 1970, purchased many of Souths' star players including John O'Neill, Ray Branighan, Ian Roberts, and more recently Dylan Walker.

 Wests Tigers – The rivalry with Wests continues from the historical rivalry between Souths and one of the teams that merged to form Wests, Balmain. The rivalry with Balmain began in 1909 when both teams  agreed to boycott the final which was being held as curtain raiser to a Kangaroos v Wallabies match. As agreed, Balmain did not turn up. However, Souths did turn up and were officially awarded the Premiership when they kicked off to an empty half of the field.

South Sydney would later meet Balmain in the 1916 premiership final which Balmain won 5–3.  In 1924, Balmain and Souths met in the grand final which is also the lowest scoring grand final in NSWRL/NRL History.  Balmain ran out 3-0 winners with the match only seeing one try. 
In 1939, Balmain and Souths met once more in the grand final with Balmain winning 33–4.
In the 1969 NSWRFL season enmity was again fueled between the clubs with Balmain's controversial victory against South Sydney in the grand final that year. The Wests Tigers and South Sydney also compete for the Beyond Blue Cup in a similar format as the Ron Coote Cup.

 Canterbury-Bankstown Bulldogs – A more recent feud that primarily developed in the years 2014 and 2015, following the 2014 NRL Grand Final and a controversial Good Friday match. They were also Grand Finalists in 1967 with South Sydney prevailing 12−10. Annually, South Sydney and Canterbury-Bankstown compete in the Good Friday game, competing for the Good Friday Cup.

Players

Current squad

2023 Signings & Transfers

Gains
Nick Mougios

Losses
Lachlan Gale - Released
Josh Mansour - Released
Mark Nicholls - Dolphins
Kodi Nikorima - Dolphins
Jaxson Paulo - Sydney Roosters

Notable players

In 2002 on the Rabbitohs' readmission to the competition, The Magnificent XIII, a team consisting of great South Sydney players over the years was selected by a panel of rugby league journalists and former Souths players and coaches. The team consists of 17 players (four being reserves) and a coach representing the South Sydney Rabbitohs Football Club from 1908 through to 2002.

Season summaries

Legend:
 Premiers    Grand Finalist  Finals   Wooden spoon

NSWRL (1908–1994)

ARL (1995–1997)

NRL (1998–present)

Club honours

Individual awards

Club awards 
The George Piggins Medal is the award given to the Rabbitohs player determined to have been the "best and fairest" throughout an NRL season. The inaugural winner of the award in 2003 was Bryan Fletcher. In 2013, John Sutton and Greg Inglis became the first joint winners of the award.

First grade

Other grades

Clive Churchill Medal 
The Clive Churchill medal is awarded annually to the player adjudged best on ground in the grand final.

 Clive Churchill (1954)*
 Jack Rayner (1955)*
 Eric Simms (1968)*
 Bob Grant (1970)*
 Ron Coote (1971)*
 Sam Burgess (2014)

* Retrospective medals

Dally M Medal 
The Dally M Medal is awarded annually to the player of the year over the course of the NRL regular season. 
 Robert Laurie (1980)

Dally M Rookie of the Year 

 Jim Sedaris (1989)
Chris Sandow (2008)
Adam Reynolds (2012)
George Burgess (2013)

Dally M Coach of the Year 

 Anthony Seibold (2018)

Dally M Team of the Year 

 Robert Laurie (Five-eighth, 1980)
 Nathan Gibbs (Second row, 1980)
 Mick Pattison (Five-eighth, 1981)
 Ian Roberts (Prop, 1987)
 Phil Blake (Five-eighth, 1989)
 Matt Parsons (Prop, 1999)
 Greg Inglis (Fullback, 2013)
 Sam Burgess (Lock, 2014)
 Damien Cook (Hooker, 2018)
 Cameron Murray (Lock, 2019)
 Cody Walker (Five-eighth, 2021)
 Alex Johnston (Wing, 2022)

NRL Immortals 

 Clive Churchill (1981)

NRL Hall of Fame inductees 
The NRL Hall of Fame recognises the contribution to rugby league in Australia since 1908. 
 Clive Churchill (2002)
 Harold Horder (2004)
 Ron Coote (2005)
 George Treweek (2006)
 Harry Wells (2007)
 Cec Blinkhorn (2018)
 Billy Cann (2018)
 Herb Gilbert (2018)
 Howard Hallett (2018)
 Brian Hambly (2018)
 Bob McCarthy (2018)
 John O'Neill (2018)
 John Sattler (2018)
 Benny Wearing (2018)

Other distinctions 

 Nathan Merritt (2006, Ken Irvine Medal)
 Nathan Merritt (2011, Ken Irvine Medal)
 Chris Sandow (2011, top point scorer)
 Greg Inglis (2013, Provan-Summons Medal)
 Damien Cook (2018, Provan-Summons Medal)
 Adam Reynolds (2020, top point scorer)
 Alex Johnston (2020, Ken Irvine Medal)
Alex Johnston (2021, Ken Irvine Medal)
Alex Johnston (2022, Ken Irvine Medal)

Statistics and records 

South Sydney are the most successful club in terms of honours and individual player achievements in the history of NSW rugby league.

The club achievements include:
 The Rabbitohs have won the most first grade premierships (21) during the history of elite rugby league competition in Australia, in addition to the most reserve grade premierships (20).
 The club has the distinction of being the only team to win a premiership in their inaugural season (1908).
 The club also has the distinction of scoring the most points (42), most tries (8) and most goals (9) in a grand final, all achieved against Manly in 1951.
 South Sydney's 1925 first grade side is one of six New South Wales sides to ever go through a season undefeated. The club won the premiership in all three grades in 1925, a feat only repeated on three other occasions (Balmain Tigers in 1915 and 1916 and St George Dragons in 1963).
 In 2008, the Rabbitohs equalled the second biggest comeback in Australian Rugby League history. After being down 28–4 after 53 minutes against the North Queensland Cowboys, the Rabbitohs won the match 29–28.

The club's players have also achieved some notable individual game and point scoring milestones:
 John Sutton holds the record for the most first grade games for the club, having played 336 matches between 2004 and 2019. 
 Jack Rayner holds the individual record of the most grand final successes as a captain (5) and coach (5) achieved between 1950 and 1955.
 Adam Reynolds holds the club record for the most points, tallying 1896 points between 2012 and 2021.
 Eric Simms scored 265 points on his own for South Sydney in 1969 and this tally remains unsurpassed by any other player at the club. 
 Eric Simms still holds a club and competition record for the most goals (112 goals and 19 field goals) in a season, most career field goals (86) and most field goals in a game (5).
 Johnny Graves' tally of 29 points in a match against Eastern Suburbs in 1952 remains the club record for the most individual points in a match. Had this feat been scored as it is today it would have stood at 32 points. 
 Alex Johnston is the only player to score 30 tries in a single season in the NRL era. He achieved the feat in both the 2021 and 2022 seasons, the only player in Australian rugby league history to complete the feat twice. 
 During his career Bob McCarthy scored 100 tries for the club, the most by a forward.
 Alex Johnston equalled the South Sydney club record of 5 tries in a 2017 match against Penrith at ANZ Stadium in a 42–14 win, joining greats such as Nathan Merritt, Harold Horder, Johnny Graves and Ian Moir. Johnston went on to score another 5 tries against the Sydney Roosters in a 60–8 win in the final round of the 2020 season.
 Alex Johnston passed Nathan Merritt's all-time try scoring record in Souths win 44–18 against Wests Tigers in round 12 of the 2022 season, with 166 tries as of the end of the 2022 season.

Head-to-head records

Discontinued teams

See also

List of teams in the NSWRL/ARL/SL/NRL
List of rugby league clubs in Australia

Notes

References

Citations

Sources

External links 
 

 
Rugby clubs established in 1908
National Rugby League clubs
Rugby league teams in Sydney
1908 establishments in Australia
Redfern, New South Wales